I Am Your Gummy Bear is the debut studio album by German virtual band Gummibär. It was released on 13 November 2007 via Gummybear International. It contains 20 songs interpreted by Gummibär, including "I'm a Gummy Bear", by far the group's most well known song.

Track list
All songs produced by tonekind and Papa Bär, except when noted.

Charts

References

External links
Gummibär website

2007 debut albums
Gummibär albums